David Copperfield is a 1956 BBC TV adaptation of Charles Dickens's 1850 novel, serialised in 13 episodes.
No recordings of this production are known to exist.

Although little is known of this version, it is said to have been remarkably similar to the 1966 BBC adaptation made almost a decade later, which was also written by Vincent Tilsley. It is also significant for being the first Dickens adaptation by the BBC for television.

Plot
For a detailed plot, see David Copperfield (novel).

Cast

The series is notable for being the debut television appearance of three actors later to become household names: Robert Hardy, Bernard Cribbins, and Graham Crowden.

Archive status
All thirteen episodes are believed to be lost. Broadcast live with pre-filmed inserts for exterior scenes, it is unknown if this serial was ever telerecorded for preservation. If it was, the films were most likely junked sometime between 1967 and 1978, when the BBC routinely discarded older programmes to make way for new material. It was quite possibly even destroyed due to the later 1966 and 1974 adaptations making it obsolete for rebroadcast.

References

External links
   

BBC television dramas
Television series set in the 1850s
1956 British television series debuts
1956 British television series endings
1950s British drama television series
Television shows based on David Copperfield
Lost BBC episodes